Mark Jeffrey Reynolds (born November 2, 1955) is an American Star class sailor and Olympic champion. He has sailed Stars since age four, training with his father James Reynolds who was the 1971 World Champion (as crew for Dennis Conner).

Reynolds competed at multiple Olympics, medaling in 1988 and 1992. In 1996 he came in eighth.  Afterwards he formed a new partnership with crewman Magnus Liljedahl, and they went on to win a string of championships, culminating with a gold medal at the 2000 Olympics.

Reynolds sailed for San Diego State University, where he received a BS. As a sophomore, Mark was All American on the San Diego State University sailing team in 1974. Mark led the team to a 2nd place finish both in 1974 and 1975 in the North American Dinghy Championships. He also holds an honorary doctorate from Piedmont College.
During the 2001–02 Volvo Ocean Race, he sailed with Team SEB.

He owns a sail making company. He made the sails for almost all of his Star class competitors.

Non-Olympic achievements:
 Snipe
 1978 US National Champion
 1979 Worlds runner up
 1979 Pan American games gold medal 
 1980,1982 & 1991 North American Champion
 Star
 1995 & 2000 World Champion
 10 times Continental Champion 
 1998 & 2002 North American Champion 
 1984, 1989, 1990, 1993, 1997, 1998 & 2002 Bacardi Cup Champion
 2001 & 2002 Commodores Cup Champion 
 2004 Rolex Miami OCR Champion
 Farr 40
 2002 World Champion (tactician)

Awards 
 1975 Intercollegiate Yacht Racing Association (ICYRA) All-American
 1989 & 1992 U.S. Olympic Committee Athlete of the Year for Sailing
 2000 ISAF World Sailor of the Year
 2000 US Sailor of the Year
 2002 Sailing World's Hall of Fame
 2012 National Sailing Hall of Fame

References

External links 
 
 
 

1955 births
Living people
American male sailors (sport)
ISAF World Sailor of the Year (male)
Sailmakers
San Diego State Aztecs sailors
San Diego Yacht Club sailors
Snipe class sailors
Star class world champions
US Sailor of the Year
Volvo Ocean Race sailors
World champions in sailing for the United States
Olympic gold medalists for the United States in sailing
Olympic silver medalists for the United States in sailing
Sailors at the 1988 Summer Olympics – Star
Sailors at the 1992 Summer Olympics – Star
Sailors at the 1996 Summer Olympics – Star
Sailors at the 2000 Summer Olympics – Star
Medalists at the 1988 Summer Olympics
Medalists at the 1992 Summer Olympics
Medalists at the 2000 Summer Olympics
Pan American Games gold medalists for the United States
Pan American Games medalists in sailing
Sailors at the 1979 Pan American Games
Medalists at the 1979 Pan American Games
Goodwill Games medalists in sailing
Competitors at the 1986 Goodwill Games